The University of Texas Longhorn Band (LHB), also known as the Showband of the Southwest, is the marching band of The University of Texas at Austin. The Longhorn Band was founded in 1900 by distinguished professor of chemistry, Dr. Eugene P. Schoch. The band is currently under the direction of Dr. Cliff Croomes. The band performs at all in-state football games, for various Texas Longhorn Athletics teams, and at special pep rallies and parades throughout the year. The band includes about 375 students, all of whom must register for a year-round course offered by the Butler School of Music.

The Longhorn Band has received prestigious honors, such as the Sudler Trophy, in 1986 and performed at many notable occasions, including Super Bowl VIII and the inaugural parades of five presidents: John F. Kennedy, Lyndon B. Johnson, Ronald Reagan, George H. W. Bush, and George W. Bush.

History

Founding and early years (1900–1955) 
The Longhorn Band was founded in 1900 by distinguished professor of chemistry, Dr. Eugene P. Schoch. With Dr. H. E. Baxter, the first director of the Longhorn Band, they purchased $150 worth of instruments from a local pawn shop and recruited 16 students to make up the band. Dr. Baxter served as the director for five years before stepping aside, after which Dr. Schoch took full control of the band. Dr. Schoch stepped down as director after five years, but continued to serve as a chaperone for the band. For the next seven years, the Longhorn Band was run by students.

In 1921, Mr. Burnett "Blondie" Pharr became the director of the Longhorn Band. Pharr developed the young band and led it on a tour through 17 states, performing at the Chicago World's Fair, Madison Square Garden, and Washington, D.C. Colonel George E. Hurt became director in 1936. Under his tenure, the Longhorn Band grew to over 200 members. After Col. Hurt suffered a stroke in 1949, Moton Crockett assumed the directorship of the Longhorn Band. In his final year as director, Mr. Crockett oversaw the purchase of the large bass drum that is today known as Big Bertha and affectionately called the "Sweetheart of the Longhorn Band". Big Bertha was purchased from the University of Chicago for $1. The drum had sat in storage in the school's stadium after UChicago disbanded their varsity football program. Big Bertha was radioactively contaminated by testing for the Manhattan Project that occurred at the stadium.

Vincent R. DiNino era (1955–1975) 
In 1955, Vincent R. DiNino was hired as the director of the Longhorn Band. He is credited with shaping the band into the organization it is today. DiNino's time as director saw the introduction of many traditions and characteristics of the band, such as the western-style uniforms, Big Flags Brigade, the Longhorn Alumni Band, and cowbells. DiNino oversaw the introduction of women into the band in a position besides majorette in 1956 and the integration of the band in 1962. The adoption of the moniker "Showband of the Southwest" also occurred during this time.

Under the direction of Mr. DiNino, the Longhorn Band performed in the inaugural parades of Presidents John F. Kennedy and Lyndon B. Johnson.

Late 20th century (1975–2001) 
Tom C. Rhodes served as director of the band from 1975 to 1980. Glenn A. Richter, an alumnus of the University of Texas, returned to his alma mater as director of the Longhorn Band from 1980 to 1995. Paula Crider became director in 1995 and remained until 1999. Kevin Sedatole served as director for the short span from 1999 to 2001.

Present day (2001–present) 
Dr. Robert Carnochan assumed the directorship of the Longhorn Band in 2001. He served as director until 2015, leaving the Longhorn Band for a position as the Director of Bands at the University of Miami.

Dr. Scott Hanna became the 14th director of the Longhorn Band in 2015. Dr. Hanna had served as the associate director of the band for the sixteen years prior to his appointment as director.

In May 2021, Dr. Hanna announced his retirement, effective May 31. Dr. Cliff Croomes, then assistant director of bands at Louisiana State University was chosen to succeed as the 15th director of the Longhorn Band and the first Black director. Dr. Croomes graduated with his Bachelor of Music from the UT Butler School of Music in 2001 and is a former member of the Longhorn Band.

Directors

Drum Majors, Presidents, and Twirlers

Organizational structure

Audition Process 
Membership in the Longhorn Band is contingent upon a multi-step audition process. Prospective members must first submit a video playing audition. Upon approval of the video audition by band staff, the prospective member is invited to Band Week, which immediately precedes the start of the fall semester, and are sent traditional music and selected halftime music. At Band Week, prospective members are taught the band's marching style and attend multiple music rehearsals to prepare for the final marching and playing audition. This final audition determines membership in the band and field placement. 

Auditions for feature twirler are held only when the position is open. These auditions occur separately from the auditions for the main band and are generally held in the spring.

Instrumentation
Rather than mellophones, baritones, and tubas, LHB has Mellos, SOB's (Society of Baritones), and TUBA!s.  Also, the band does not march flutes, only piccolos or Piccs.

Marching
The Longhorn Band performs a different show at each home football game throughout the year. These shows include 'Traditional Shows', which feature signature music and drill, and 'Non-Traditional Shows', which feature contemporary music and a modern marching style.

Curl-on entrance
The curl-on entrance is a traditional entrance in which the marchers enter from both east and west sidelines. To reach this position, the section is positioned on the field, divided in the center, and then the marcher closest to the sideline begins a spiral towards the nearest end zone until all marchers are in a tight spiral with the last marcher on the sideline. This entrance is utilized for Wall-to-Wall Band performances, as well as other special occasions. Marchers enter with a Taps 8 to 5 stride, but adjust to a 6 to 5 interval for downfield marching.

Execution

After 4 whistles, the percussion will play eight "dead beats," during which time the band remains at attention. The function of these 8 counts is to establish tempo in a noisy stadium. Following the 8 dead beats, the person on the sideline leads on the marchers to the field. Marchers kick off from the sideline every two steps. After a designated number of counts, a 9-count halt cadence will be played.

Script Texas
First performed in 1957, "Script Texas" is a traditional halftime show performed every year. The Drum Major leads the band onto the field in a single-file line, spelling "Texas" in script writing. The band is split into two blocks at the start of the performance and begins by playing "The Yellow Rose of Texas." The Drum Major marches over to the front of block one and block one begins spelling out the T-E-X of "Texas". They only spell out the bottom part of the T and the / of the X, though. While the first block follows the Drum Major out onto the field, the color guard who are in block one march in a large circle to the side of the band before putting the top on the T after block one has marched to their positions. At the end of "The Yellow Rose of Texas," the band goes straight into "March of the Longhorns" and the rest of "Texas" is spelled out. Once "March of the Longhorns" is over, "Calypso" starts and the Drum Major leads the Saxophones, who are by themselves, into an arc that comes down and below A and S. This concludes Script Texas, and "Texas Fight" is played while the band marches off of the field.

Wall-to-Wall Band/Shotgun Texas

"Wall to Wall Band" is another traditional drill performed annually by Longhorn Band. The drum line starts in the end zone while the band is off on each of the sidelines curled into spirals. The drum line marches onto the field, playing a cadence while the band usually jumps up and down over on the sides. After the drum line reaches their starting position, the Drum Major calls the band to attention, followed by another cadence that brings the band onto the field. The spirals are unrolled and the band marches straight down the yard lines and form into fronts. A roll off ensues, and "March Grandioso" begins. Every six counts, parts of fronts step off, marching in a six-to-five step, and form less dense fronts that still span the width of the field. Halfway through "March Grandioso," the band halts for 4 counts of silence, followed by a proclamation to beat the hell out of Texas' opponent. The band then continues down the field playing the rest of "March Grandioso" and transitioning straight into "March of the Longhorns." Once a front reaches the opposite end zone, a counter-march is performed to bring the band back the way it came. Before the counter-march, the Longhorn band covers the entire football field, putting meaning to the name Wall-to-Wall band. At the trio of "March of the Longhorns," the band contracts into larger fronts that span the width of the football field, then condense into smaller ones that span a little more than the distance between the hashes. At the end of "March of the Longhorns," Wall-to-Wall Band is officially finished, though it is typically followed by Shotgun Texas, in which several condensed fronts quickly shift to spell "TEXAS" in block letters. To start Shotgun Texas, another roll off starts and the band goes straight into "Texas Fight." After the Intro of "Texas Fight," the band spells out each letter of "TEXAS," leaving the fronts every 8 counts of "Texas Fight." In 2007, a twist was added to Shotgun Texas where, during the Interlude of "Texas Fight," the Longhorn band flipped the "Texas" from its traditionally facing west direction to spell it to the east side for the student section of the stadium. After the Interlude, the band marches off the field, concluding Shotgun Texas.

Pregame

Prior to kickoff at all home football games, the band marches through the north tunnel and fills the north end-zone with fourteen fronts. Instruments are held above the heads of the band members while they march in before coming down to play the fight song. The fronts cross the field using a modified high-step, called Taps Stride. The fronts march through the duration of "Texas Fight" and 8 counts afterwards, then halt and perform "Eyes Fanfare" to the east, north, and finally west side.  Afterwards, the band begins "Texas Fight" again and marches the rest of the way down the field, turning once each front hits the 15 yard line and performing a counter-march toward the opposite end zone until stopping at the end of "Texas Fight." The band turns to face the west stands and performs an up-tempo arrangement of "Texas our Texas", the official state song, and the fronts then adjust to form an interlocking UT. The band stays at this position for announcements, the opponent's school song, and finally "The Star Spangled Banner" is played. Since some opponents travel long distances, they can't bring their band. If this is the case, the Longhorn band plays the opponents school song. After "The Star Spangled Banner" and the presentation of the colors, the band starts "Deep in the Heart of Texas" and marches to form a block T. After "Deep in the Heart of Texas," the sideways block T is then floated toward the south end zone while the band plays "Calypso." About a third of the way through "Calypso," the band halts and faces toward the 25 or 35 yard line. Normally, the top of the T stops at the back of the south end zone.  However, due to stadium construction, for the 2007 season, the visiting team uses a locker room at the south end of the stadium, so the band stops at the front of the end zone to give the visiting team room to run to their side line.  Once stopped, there are a few more announcements that take place, followed by the possible performance of "March Grandioso." "March Grandioso" is only played if enough time is left before the football team comes out. If not, the band goes straight into "The Eyes of Texas." Right after this, a short video is shown, followed by the entrance of the football team, accompanied by "Texas Fight." After this, the band marches through the south end zone before entering the stand for the game.

Non-traditional shows 
The Longhorn Band performs four non-traditional shows each year. The band typically selects music that highlights a wide variety of musical artists and thematic ideas. The music and drill for these performances are arranged by current and former staff of the University of Texas School of Music. Thanks to the high general level of musical talent in the Longhorn Band, complex arrangements of popular tunes appear many times every year.

Selected recent non-traditional shows
Grammy's Show – "Get Lucky", "Happy", "Can't Hold Us", "Black Dog", and "Kashmir" Performed November 27, 2014
Buble Show – "It Had Better Be Tonight", "Fever", and "Theme from Spiderman" Performed October 4, 2014
LHBeyoncé Show – "End of Time", "Crazy in Love", "Single Ladies", "Love on Top", "Countdown", and "Love on Top" Performed September 7, 2014
Les Misérables Show – "Look Down", "On My Own", "Plummet Attack", and "One Day More" Performed October 12, 2013
Funk Show – "Living in America", "Superstition", "Uptight", and "Fantasy" Performed November 28, 2013
Disney Show – "The Incredibles", "Pirates of the Caribbean", and "Circle of Life" – Performed September 14, 2013The Who Show – "Who Are You", "Pinball Wizard", "I Can See for Miles", "Won't Get Fooled Again" Performed November 22, 2012Music from West Side Story – "Mambo", "Maria", "Tonight" Performed October 20, 2012Queen Show – "Somebody to Love", "We Are the Champions", "Bicycle Race", "Fat Bottomed Girls", "Bohemian Rhapsody" Performed November 19, 2011Led Zeppelin Show – "Rock and Roll", "Heartbreaker", "Black Dog", "Kashmir", "Stairway to Heaven" Performed January 5, 2009 at the Fiesta Bowl
Heroes Show – "Batman/ Superman", "The Incredibles", "Robin Hood: Prince of Thieves" Performed November 10, 2007Channel One Suite – Buddy Rich's "Channel One Suite" Performed October 20, 2007TV Show – Theme from "Hawaii Five-O", "The A-Team", "The Simpsons", "Family Guy" Performed November 4, 200670s/80s Rock Show – "Any Way You Want It", "25 or 6 to 4", "Carry On Wayward Son" Performed September 2, 2006The Beatles Show – "Help!", "Got to Get You In My Life", "She Loves You", "I Want to Hold You Hand", "Hey Jude" Performed January 4, 2006 at the Rose Bowl
Malagueña – Ernesto Lecuona's "Malagueña" Performed October 7, 2006Secret Agent Show – Theme from "James Bond", "Austin Powers", "Inspector Gadget" Performed October 22, 2005Video Game Show – Theme from "Tetris", "The Legend of Zelda", "Super Mario Bros." Performed November 6, 2004Music
In attendance at all home and away football games, the band performs signature songs. Many have been rooted in the band for many years.

 "The Eyes of Texas"
 "Texas Fight"
 "Taps in One" (a version of Texas Fight played in 3, played after a win)
 "Wabash Cannonball" (first played at the request of Darrell K Royal), coincidentally a main fight song of Big 12 Conference rival Kansas State
 "March Grandioso"
 "March of the Longhorns"
 "Deep in the Heart of Texas"
 "Calypso"
 "William Tell Overture"
 "UT Detroit"
 "Victory"
 "Ghost Riders in the Sky"
 "Respect"
 "Rawhide"
 "Bone Tell" (a version of William Tell Overture arranged for the trombone section and performed at all home games, sometimes for fans around the stadium)
 "Strong Eyes"
 "Mickey Mouse March" (played to make fun of the Texas A&M Aggies; the Longhorn Band discontinued this practice after the 1999 Aggie Bonfire collapse)

Features
Big Bertha

The band features Big Bertha, which is considered to be one of the world's largest bass drums. The drum is managed by the Bertha Crew, sometimes called "drum wranglers". The crew moves the drum around the field during performances, and twirls it when the team scores. Big Bertha was nicknamed the "Sweetheart of the Longhorn Band" when it arrived at The University of Texas campus in 1955. In 1955, the director of the Longhorn Band was Colonel D. Harold Byrd who purchased Big Bertha from the University of Chicago, then for only one dollar. Big Bertha performs in the traditional Longhorn Band pregame show performed before kickoff at every home game. She also performs in 'Script Texas', another LHB traditional show. She makes appearances at other events, such as appearing outside Gregory Gymnasium before volleyball games.

The drum was retired on October 15, 2022 after 100 years of service, making its last appearance during the halftime show in the football game with the Iowa State Cyclones alongside its replacement, Big Bertha II. The new drum measures 9.5 ft in diameter, making it the largest bass drum in the world.

Cowbells
During football games, members of the Longhorn Band shake cowbells to create noise in the stadium while the opposing team has the ball. The bells are rung only after the opposing team snaps the ball or in conjunction with drum cadences. When the opposing team is in the "red zone", the drumline will, at times, call a cadence that simply calls for the band to create as much noise as possible with the cowbells.

Travel Band
While the entire band traditionally travels to all in-state football games and bowl games, a smaller travel band composed mainly of section leaders is taken to out-of-state games.

SEC Flags (since 2025)

Traditions

The University of Texas and Longhorn Band are rooted in countless traditions and historic events. High standards of achievement are at the foundation of these institutions. The most important and lasting of all band traditions are the ever-present pride and spirit. Longhorn Band, the largest organization on The University of Texas campus, is the backbone of school spirit on campus. They take the initiative at pep rallies and games in firing up Texas fans with their favorite yells, and generally add to the excitement that is so characteristic of Texas sporting events. Below are a few of examples of these Longhorn Band and University of Texas traditions.

"Shake the Fringe"
Performed in conjunction with certain drum cadences, "Shake the Fringe" refers to the effect that results from a Longhorn Band member moving their shoulders back and forth in quick, violent motions.  The "Fringe" of the uniform then flails wildly in the air.

"Home on the Range"
Sung during the last two minutes of every home football game, the members of the Longhorn Band place their arms around each other, begin swaying from side to side and then jump up-and-down as they sing their own colorful take on a traditional state song:
Home, home on the range,
where the deer and the antelope play [shout: with themselves!]
Where seldom is heard,
a discouraging word,
and the skies are not cloudy all day. [Hey, hey, hey]

The tradition started in the 1970s when the band would often sing dirty songs in the stands. The director at the time yelled at the band to sing something nice like "Home on the Range", and so the version now sung was created.

"Hup...hup...hup"
Innocent and unsuspecting pedestrians may find themselves as objects of entertainment for the Longhorn Band members.  After targeting an individual, LHB members will yell "hup" every time the target takes a step.  Once the individual realizes what is happening they typically adjust their strides in an effort to confuse, trick, evade, or hoodwink the band.  The "hups" continue until the individual stands still, at which point the band lets out a long sigh, or if the individual trips and falls down.

In The Stands
The Longhorn Band follows many traditions while in the stands for Longhorn football games.  Most of all, all members stand for the entire game and yell before every play in conjunction with ringing their cowbells.  Numerous times throughout the game, the "Texas! . . . Fight!" chant is yelled by the entire stadium.  Also, the drumline plays cadences between almost every play, all of which are accompanied by dancing or chanting, such as "Go, Horns, Go", "Where my horns at?", "Defense!", and "Texas, Texas, yeehaw!"

 New Member Beanie 
After audition results are posted, the new members are presented with the traditional Longhorn Band New Member Beanie. There is then a contest held to see which of the new members can consecutively wear the beanie to practices the longest. The male and female new members who wear their beanie the longest are traditionally rewarded with a steak dinner.

Spring Banquet
Each spring, usually the first weekend in May, the Longhorn Band Spring Awards Banquet takes place. This event is not only a celebration of the previous year's achievements but also the event that passes the torch to the next generation of LHB by the presentation of scholarships and traditional honors such as:

 Scholarships awarded by the Alumni Band
 Lettering awards for LHB's First and Veteran Members
 Passing of the President's Ring to the new council president
 Passing of the Freshman Advisor Beanies to the new Advisors
 Announcement of the next year's Drum Major, and presentation of the Drum Major Buckle''
 Presentation of various other awards for service, achievement, or other significance.

President's Ring
One tradition of LHB is the "Passing of the President's Ring." During this ceremony, which takes place at the annual Spring Banquet, the former Band President presents the ring to the new President. The tradition began at the close of World War II when the parents of Curtis Popham, Longhorn Band Drum Major, who was killed in the war, gave Curtis' University ring to the Band for this purpose.

Drum Major's belt buckle
The Drum Major's belt buckle is passed on to the new Drum Major at the annual Spring Banquet. Engraved on the back are the names of past Longhorn Band Drum Majors beginning in 1969.

Auxiliary and related organizations

Longhorn Alumni Band 
The Longhorn Alumni Band, or LHAB, was founded in 1964 and is composed of former members of the Longhorn Band. The Longhorn Alumni Band plays at many events, services, and celebrations around the state as well as Alumni Band Day. On Alumni Band Day, many of the former band members come together for a special halftime performance during one of the football games. During the combined performance, LHB and LHAB share the field, with over 1,000 musicians. The Longhorn Alumni Band is the largest in the world, with 2,600 members among its ranks, scattered around the globe.

Longhorn Band Student Association 
The Longhorn Band Student Association (LHBSA) is the group responsible for organizing student activities within the Longhorn Band. Its main purpose is to serve the Longhorn Band by helping members become acquainted and accustomed to working with one another. The LHBSA is a registered student organization with the U.T. Dean of Students office. Membership is open to any Longhorn Band member, and the active fees are determined by the members each year. The LHBSA sponsors social events throughout the year and the annual Longhorn Band Awards Banquet in the spring.

The officers of LHBSA are collectively termed the Band Council. Election of officers is held during the spring semester at a general meeting of the members of the LHBSA. The Freshman Advisors are elected by the LHBSA members during a general meeting in the fall. The Presidents of Kappa Kappa Psi and Tau Beta Sigma are elected by their respective organizations and the Drum Major is determined by audition. Freshman Representatives are elected by the first year members of Longhorn Band at a special meeting following the posting of the final Longhorn Band audition results. The Parliamentarian, if deemed beneficial, is appointed by the President.

Kappa Kappa Psi/Tau Beta Sigma 
The band is supported by a service fraternity and sorority, the Alpha Tau chapter of Kappa Kappa Psi and the Beta Gamma chapter of Tau Beta Sigma, respectively.

Longhorn Pep Band
The Longhorn Pep Band plays at all home volleyball and men's and women's basketball games. While technically a separate ensemble from the Longhorn Band, it falls under the same umbrella of leadership and shares many members with the Longhorn Band.

Supporting organizations

The Longhorn Air Force Reserve Officers Training Corps (AFJROTC) Detachment 825 maintains a small military band that also supports the Longhorn Marching Band.

Awards and honors
In 1974, the Longhorn Band was selected to perform at Super Bowl VIII in Houston, Texas.
In 1986, the Longhorn Band was awarded the prestigious Louis Sudler Intercollegiate Marching Band Trophy.
The Longhorn Band was selected and performed for inaugurations of Presidents Theodore Roosevelt, John F. Kennedy, Lyndon B. Johnson, Ronald Reagan, George H. W. Bush and the two inaugurations of George W. Bush.

Honorary members
On May 7, 2007, for the first time in Longhorn Band history presented Coach Mack Brown and Athletic Director DeLoss Dodds with Honorary Membership for their outstanding spirit, pride, and leadership.  The Longhorn Band Honorary Membership honor was established by then President of Kappa Kappa Psi Eddie Lopez.

Notable alumni
 Rex Tillerson – 69th United States Secretary of State and former ExxonMobil CEO
 Alan Bean - NASA astronaut and 4th man to walk on the moon
 Michael Webber Distinguished engineering professor, author, and energy scientist
 Carl Meade - NASA astronaut and mission specialist on STS-38, STS-50, and STS-64

References

External links

 The University of Texas Longhorn Band
 The University of Texas Longhorn Alumni Band
 Story on Longhorn Football and Band on ESPN.com

Musical groups established in 1900
University of Texas at Austin
Big 12 Conference marching bands
Musical groups from Texas
1900 establishments in Texas